Rahimullah Yusufzai (رحیم اللہ یوسُفزئی) (10 September 1954 – 9 September 2021) was a Pakistani journalist, political and security analyst, best known for having interviewed Osama bin Laden, and Afghan Taliban leader Mullah Omar. 

He was also a war correspondent.

Early life and education
Yusufzai was born on 10 September 1954, in Pakistan in Shamozai village of Mardan District in Khyber Pakhtunkhwa. He received his early education at his village primary school and then in public schools in Peshawar and Jhelum. Rahimullah also studied at the D.J. Sindh College and the University of Karachi.

Career
Yusufzai was among the first journalists to report on the Taliban and visited Kandahar, Afghanistan in 1995. He was one of the few bona fide experts on Afghanistan, having reported on the country since the 1979 invasion of Afghanistan by the former Soviet Union. In 2016, he also frequently appeared on Geo News TV channel as a news analyst. He was the editor of the Jang Group's The News International at the Peshawar Bureau and was an op-ed writer for the monthly Newsline. Rahimullah is especially noted for holding the last interview with Osama bin Laden. He also served as a correspondent in Pakistan for Time magazine. Rahimullah was also a correspondent of BBC's Pashto and Urdu services in Khyber Pakhtunkhwa province of Pakistan.

Awards and recognition
Yusufzai was considered an authority on Afghan affairs and on the Federally Administered Tribal Areas (FATA) of Pakistan. Acknowledging his achievements in journalism, the government of Pakistan first awarded him the Tamgha-e-Imtiaz (Medal of Excellence) in 2005. Then he received Sitara-i-Imtiaz Award (Star of Excellence) from the President of Pakistan for his achievements in the field of journalism on 23 March 2010.

Death
Yusufzai died from cancer on 9 September 2021 after battling his deadly cancer for 15 long months. Among his survivors are four sons and two daughters. His funeral prayer was offered in his hometown Inzargi, Katlang, Mardan District and laid to rest on 10 September 2021. Prime Minister Imran Khan, Chief of Army Staff General Qamar Javed Bajwa, Awami National Party leader Asfandyar Wali Khan, Qaumi Watan Party chief Aftab Ahmad Khan Sherpao, Federal Minister Chaudhry Fawad Hussain, Pakistan Federal Union of Journalists and others offered condolences upon his death.

References

External links
 Sharif tells committee to initiate talks with Taliban Zee News India website
 Osama bin Laden is alive, says Pak journalist Rediff.com website, Published 3 April 2010
 Face to face with Osama The Guardian (newspaper), Published 25 September 2001

1954 births
2021 deaths
Pashtun people
Pakistani male journalists
People from Mardan District
Recipients of Tamgha-e-Imtiaz
Recipients of Sitara-i-Imtiaz
University of Karachi alumni
People from Peshawar
Pakistani television journalists
Pakistani war correspondents
D. J. Sindh Government Science College alumni
BBC people